The nonidentity problem (also called the paradox of future individuals) in population ethics is the problem that an act may still be wrong even if it is not wrong for anyone. More precisely, the nonidentity problem is the inability to simultaneously hold the following beliefs: (1) a person-affecting view; (2) bringing someone into existence whose life is worth living, albeit flawed, is not "bad for" that person; (3) some acts of bringing someone into existence are wrong even if they are not bad for someone.

Rivka Weinberg has used the nonidentity problem to study the ethics of reproduction.

See also 
 Derek Parfit
 Mere addition paradox

References 

Population ethics
Identity (philosophy)